This is a list of named geological features, except craters, on Ganymede, a moon of Jupiter. The list is complete as of August 2022.

Catenae (crater chains)

Faculae

Fossae (ditches)

Paterae

Regiones

Sulci

See also

List of quadrangles on Ganymede
List of craters on Ganymede

References
List of named surface features on Ganymede

Ganymede
Ganymede (moon)